The Cannes Lions International Festival of Creativity (formerly the International Advertising Festival) is a global event for those working in creative communications, advertising, and related fields. It is considered the largest gathering of the advertising and creative communications industry.

The five-day festival, incorporating the awarding of the Lions awards, is held yearly at the Palais des Festivals et des Congrès in Cannes, France.  During the last week of June, around 15,000 registered delegates from 90 countries visit the Festival to celebrate the best of creativity in brand communication, discuss industry issues, and network with one another. The week's activities include multiple award ceremonies as well as an opening and closing gala.

History
Inspired by the Cannes Film Festival, staged in Cannes since the late 1940s, a group of cinema screen advertising contractors belonging to the Screen Advertising World Association (Sawa) felt the makers of advertising films should be similarly recognised. They established the International Advertising Film Festival, the first of which took place in Venice, Italy, in September 1954, with 187 film entries from 14 countries. The lion of the Piazza San Marco in Venice was the inspiration for the Lion trophy.

The second festival was held in Monte Carlo, and the third in Cannes. After that, the event alternated between Venice and Cannes before settling in the latter in 1984. New categories have been awards in recent years: the Press & Outdoor Lions competition in 1992; the Cyber Lions in 1998 (retired after 2017); Media Lions in 1999; Direct Lions in 2002; Radio, and Titanium Lions in 2005; Promo & Activation Lions in 2006 (retired after 2017); Design Lions in 2008; PR Lions in 2009; Film Craft in 2010; Creative Effectiveness in 2011; Branded Content & Entertainment and Mobile Lions in 2012; Innovation in 2013 and Creative eCommerce and Social & Influencer in 2018. However, in recent years, there have been calls from within the industry for the Festival to simplify the entry categories to better reflect the current state of the modern communications world. The festival responded by introducing changes in 2018, including new categories, revising costs and reducing the event from seven days to five.

In the 1990s, the Festival also added a programme of learning in the form of seminars and workshops. Over the years, this side of the Festival has grown considerably, and in 2013 it featured around 130 sessions over 7 days. These included talks from Christopher Bailey, Jack Black, Jenson Button, Nick Cannon, Shepard Fairey, Arianna Huffington, David Karp, and Annie Leibovitz.

In 2004, British publisher and conference organiser EMAP plc (now called Ascential) purchased the festival from French businessman Roger Hatchuel – who had started managing it in 1987 – for a reported £52 million. In June 2014, the Wall Street Journal as well as Campaign Magazine reported on Nimrod Kamer's protestations at Cannes Lions.

Philip Thomas is the Chairman and Simon Cook the Managing Director. Thomas is also the President and Chief Executive Officer of Ascential Events, under which Cannes Lions operates.

The Awards

Cannes Lions juries are drawn from experts in each field from around the world. Each jury is headed by a jury president. They judge submissions in Film, Film Craft, Industry Craft, Digital Craft, Media, Print & Publishing, Outdoor, Direct, Pharma, Health & Wellness, Design, Radio & Audio, Mobile, Branded Content & Entertainment, Brand Experience & Activation, Creative eCommerce, Entertainment, Entertainment Lions for Music, PR, Creative Effectiveness, Social & Influencer, Creative Data, Innovation and Titanium, as well as Glass: The Lion for Change and Sustainable Development Goals. In 2013, the Festival launched a new category called the Innovation Lions, which are supposed to "honour the technology and innovation which facilitates creativity", including recognition of the 'Top 10 Startups to Watch'. Additionally, global start-ups can apply for the Start-up Academy to receive festival passes and access mentorship sessions.

Other awards include Holding Company of the Year, Network of the Year, Media Agency of the Year, Agency of the Year, Independent Agency of the Year, Media Person of the Year, New Directors' Showcase, Advertiser of the Year, and the Palme d'Or to the best production company.

Advertisements are generally entered by the agencies that created them, although technically anyone can enter any advertising creation, providing it ran within a specified time frame. The jurors are instructed to reward advertising that is deemed most creative both in idea and execution.

In an article in The Guardian in 2009, WPP boss Sir Martin Sorrell said the Cannes Lions awards were too costly to enter. However, a year later, he also admitted that he had made sure that WPP was "very, very focused on Cannes" and wanted to be "the leader in terms of awards at Cannes". In 2011, WPP won the first Holding Company of the Year prize at the Festival. Commenting on this industry recognition, WPP Worldwide Creative Director, John O'Keeffe, said:

"Cannes is the only global, cross discipline show, covering advertising, design, digital, media, promo, effectiveness, and everything else besides. It doesn't aggregate the scores of other shows, so you can't inflate your ranking on the back of just one or two pieces of work. If you are number one at Cannes, you've done it the hard way, the proper way, the only way".

In 2013, the "Dumb Ways to Die" a campaign by McCann Australia for Australian company Metro Trains made history by winning a total of five Grands Prix awards, the most ever awarded to a single piece of work.

The Lion of St. Mark is an honor given each year at the Cannes Lions International Festival of Creativity to "someone who has made outstanding contributions to the creative community".

Young Lions Competitions
The Young Lions Competitions (previously known as the Young Creatives competition, which started in 1995) is open to advertising professionals up to 30 years old working in teams of two. The competition takes place during the festival week in Cannes in seven divisions: print, digital, film, design, young marketers, media, and PR. Regional competitions are held in most countries to select teams in the lead-up to the Festival, with winners of these going into the final round of the competitions at Cannes Lions. A design competition was launched in 2012.

Lions Health
In June 2012, Cannes Lions announced that it plans to launch a new two-day event for creative communications in healthcare, wellness, and sustainability. Taking place in the Palais des Festivals in Cannes, France, just before Cannes Lions kicks off on 15 June 2014, the event will offer two days of content that will explore and debate the essential and unique issues relating to the world of healthcare communications. The move was welcomed by some sections of the industry, with Jeremy Perrott, global creative director of McCann Health, commenting: "Lions Health gives the industry the highest stage to showcase its brilliance". In 2017 Lions Health was moved to take place at the same time as the main festival, but remains a standalone event in another part of the Palais.

References

External links
Cannes Lions International Festival of Creativity Official website
Cannes Lions Archive at CannesLions.com

Advertising awards
Ascential
Festivals in France
Festivals established in 1954
Awards established in 1954
Tourist attractions in Alpes-Maritimes
Cannes